Graham Island is an uninhabited island in Qikiqtaaluk Region, Nunavut, Canada. A member of the Queen Elizabeth Islands and Arctic Archipelago, it is located in Norwegian Bay off the coast of Ellesmere Island. It was named in 1910.

Variation 
There is a second, much smaller (about 2.0 × 0.5 km), Graham Island, also in Nunavut, off Boothia Peninsula. It was named in 1966.

References

External links
 Graham Island in the Atlas of Canada - Toporama; Natural Resources Canada
 Graham Island in the Atlas of Canada - Toporama; Natural Resources Canada (the smaller one)

Islands of the Queen Elizabeth Islands
Uninhabited islands of Qikiqtaaluk Region